John Hippisley may refer to 

John Hippisley (1530–1570), MP for Wells and Bridport
John Hippisley (Parliamentarian) (fl. 1617–1653), English MP for Petersfield, Dover and Cockermouth
Sir John Hippisley, 1st Baronet (c.1746–1825), English MP for Sudbury
John Hippisley (actor), English comic actor and playwright